Matthew David Myers  (born 10 November 1970) is a judge of the Federal Circuit and Family Court of Australia and an adjunct professor at the Faculty of Law, University of New South Wales. He is the first Aboriginal Australian to have been appointed as a federal court judge.

Early life and education
Myers was born on 10 November 1970. He grew up in La Perouse located in Sydney's south and later moved with his family to French's Forest, where he attended Forest High School (Sydney). Myers developed an interest in law at an early age after witnessing an event in which a lawyer intervened between citizens of Eveleigh Street and the police.

Career
In 2015, Myers was criticised in the press for performing his own research and imposing his personal views in a decision. In February 2017 he was appointed as an Australian Law Reform Commission Commissioner to lead the inquiry into Incarceration rates of Aboriginal and Torres Strait Islander peoples. Myers is a Fellow of the Australian Academy of Law.

See also
 Law Council of Australia
 Law Society of New South Wales

References 

21st-century Australian judges
1970 births
University of New South Wales alumni
Living people
Judges of the Federal Circuit Court of Australia
Indigenous Australian people
Members of the Order of Australia